Beja  is a village in Kapurthala district of Punjab State, India. The village is administrated by a Sarpanch, who is an elected representative.

Demography 
According to the report published by Census India in 2011, Beja has a total number of 25 houses and population of 162 of which include 81 males and 81 females. Literacy rate of Beja is 77.86%, higher than state average of 75.84%.  The population of children under the age of 6 years is 22 which is 13.58% of total population of Beja, and child sex ratio is approximately  833, lower than state average of 846.

Population data

Air travel connectivity 
The closest airport to the village is Sri Guru Ram Dass Jee International Airport.

Villages in Kapurthala

External links
  Villages in Kapurthala
 Kapurthala Villages List

References

Villages in Kapurthala district